Cagayan North International Airport , sometimes referred as Lal-lo International Airport, is an airport serving the general area of the Cagayan Special Economic Zone, located in the northern province of Cagayan, Philippines. It is located between the Barangays of San Mariano and Dagupan in Lal-lo, Cagayan and is accessible via Magapit–Santa Teresita Road. The airport has been built to support the Cagayan Special Economic Zone in northern Cagayan, in tandem with Port Irene that will handle seaborne traffic. The airport is currently served by the charter airline Royal Air Philippines.

History 
The airport was envisioned to be the international gateway in Northeast Luzon. Initially, it was constructed to serve the domestic flights to other airports in the country and international flights to Japan, Hong Kong, Taiwan, Singapore and China. An aviation park and hangar hub was also envisioned for the airport where business and private jets can park.

On June 23, 2016, the Civil Aviation Authority of the Philippines (CAAP) granted the airport new certification allowing it to handle aircraft with a capacity of up to 100 seats, up from only 29-seat capacity aircraft under the previous certification. The new certification has allowed the possibility of regular commercial flights to begin operation at the airport. At the time of the new certification, the airport has fielded around 168 flights ranging from tourism, diplomatic visits and emergency services. Meanwhile, the airport served its first two commercial flights with two planes from Macau landing in the airport in March 2018.

Facilities
The airport's major facilities are the control tower, passengers’ lounge. This allows the airport to accommodate narrow-body commercial airliners such as Airbus A320 and Boeing 737.

See also

 Tuguegarao Airport
 Cagayan Special Economic Zone
 List of airports in the Philippines

References

Airports in the Philippines
Buildings and structures in Cagayan